is a railway station in the city of Nikkō, Tochigi, Japan, operated by the private railway operator Tobu Railway. The station is numbered "TN-57".

Lines

Station layout
The station consists of one side platform and one island platform, serving three tracks, connected to the station entrance by a footbridge.

Platforms

Adjacent stations

History
Kinugawa-Kōen Station opened in May 1939. The station was closed from 25 October 1944 to 1 September 1950. It was closed again from 1 December 1961 to 10 December 1962.

A new station building was completed in 2006.

From 17 March 2012, station numbering was introduced on all Tobu lines, with Kinugawa-Kōen Station becoming "TN-56". It was renumbered "TN-57" on 21 April 2017 ahead of the opening of Tobu World Square Station (TN-55) in July 2017.

Surrounding area
 
Kinugawa River
Kinugawa Onsen
Kinugawa Park
Kinugawa Onsen Ropeway

Passenger statistics
In fiscal 2019, the station was used by an average of 249 passengers daily (boarding passengers only).

See also
 List of railway stations in Japan

References

External links

  

Railway stations in Tochigi Prefecture
Stations of Tobu Railway
Railway stations in Japan opened in 1939
Tobu Kinugawa Line
Nikkō, Tochigi